Texting while driving, also called texting and driving, is the act of composing, sending, or reading text messages on a mobile phone while operating a motor vehicle. Texting while driving is considered extremely dangerous by many people, including authorities, and in some places has either been outlawed or restricted. As a form of distracted driving, texting while driving significantly increases the chances that a driver will be involved in a motor vehicle accident.

Prevalence
Research by the NHTSA suggested that an estimated 660,000 drivers out of almost 212 million licensed drivers used their phones at any given daylight moment in the U.S. during driving in 2011. According to a report issued by the U.S. Department of Transportation, drivers between the ages of 20 to 29 are the most likely to text while driving. The International Telecommunication Union states that "texting, making calls, and other interaction with in-vehicle information and communication systems while driving is a serious source of driver distraction and increases the risk of traffic accidents".

Research
The scientific literature on the dangers of driving while sending a text message from a mobile phone, or driving while texting, is limited but growing. A systematic review study at the Queensland University of Technology Centre for Accident Research and Road Safety-Queensland CARRS-Q found that visual-manual interactions such as texting and browsing have a detrimental effect on a number of safety-critical driving measures. Specifically, negative effects were seen in detecting and responding correctly to road signs, detecting hazards, time spent with eyes off the road, and (only for sending text messages) lateral position. Mean speed, speed variability, lateral position when receiving text messages, and following distance showed no difference. A separate, yet unreleased simulation study at the University of Utah found a sixfold increase in distraction-related crashes when texting.

The low number of scientific studies may be indicative of a general assumption that if talking on a mobile phone increases risk, then texting also increases risk, and probably more so. 89% of U.S. adults think that text messaging while driving is "distracting, dangerous and should be outlawed". The AAA Foundation for Traffic Safety has released polling data that show that 87% of people consider texting and e-mailing while driving a "very serious" safety threat, almost equivalent to the 90% of those polled who consider drunk driving a threat. Recently, AAA released a study showing texting while driving is six times more likely to cause an accident than drunk driving.

Despite the acknowledgement of the dangers of texting behind the wheel, about half of drivers 16 to 24 say they have texted while driving, compared with 22 percent of drivers 35 to 44. A survey of more than 90 teens from more than 26 high schools throughout the United States conducted by Liberty Mutual Insurance Group in 2006 showed that 46% of students consider texting to be either "very" or "extremely" distracting. An American Automobile Association study showed that 34% of teens (age 16–17) admitted to being distracted behind the wheel because of texting and 40% of American teens say they have been in a car when the driver used a cell phone in a way that put people in danger. A study involving commercial vehicle operators conducted in September 2009 concluded that though incidence of texting within their data set was low, texting while driving increased the risk of accident significantly.

Texting while driving received greater attention in the late 2000s, corresponding to a rise in the number of text messages being sent. The 2008 Will Smith movie Seven Pounds deals with Smith's character committing suicide in order to donate his organs to help save the lives of seven people to make up for the seven people he killed in a car accident because he was receiving a text message while he was driving. Texting while driving attracted interest in the media after several highly publicized car crashes were caused by texting drivers, including a May 2009 incident involving a Boston trolley car driver who crashed while texting his girlfriend. Texting was blamed in the 2008 Chatsworth train collision which killed 25 passengers. Investigations revealed that the engineer of that train had sent 45 text messages while operating. Despite these incidents, texting was still on the rise.

A July 2010 Fairleigh Dickinson University PublicMind poll found 25% of New Jersey voters admitted to sending a text while driving, which was an increase from 15% in 2008. This increase could be attributed to drivers over the age of 30 sending text messages. More than 35% of New Jersey drivers aged 30 to 45 and 17% of drivers over 45 admitted to having sent a text message while driving in the last year, an increase of 5–10% from 2008.
Several studies have attempted to compare the dangers of texting while driving with driving under the influence. One such study was conducted by Car and Driver magazine in June 2009. The study, carried out at the Oscoda-Wurtsmith Airport in Oscoda, Michigan, used two drivers in real cars and measured reaction times to the onset of light on the windshield. The study compared the reaction times and distances of the subjects while reading a text message, replying to the text message, and impaired. Impaired driving at the same speed resulted in an increase of 0.01 and 0.07 seconds. In terms of stopping distances these times were estimated to mean:
Unimpaired: 0.54 seconds to brake
Legally drunk: add 
Reading e-mail: add 
Sending a text: add 
On September 29, 2010, the insurance industry's Highway Loss Data Institute released research purporting to show that texting-while-driving bans in four states failed to reduce crashes and may instead have contributed to an increase in road crashes.  U.S. Transportation Secretary Ray LaHood called the study "completely misleading".

In March 2012, the UK's Institute of Advanced Motorists published a study which claimed that using social media puts a driver at greater risk than driving under the influence. In 2013, based on the 2011 Youth Risk Behavior Surveillance System Survey conducted by the Center for Disease Control in the US, nearly half of all male and female respondents aged 16 to 19 reported they texted while driving.

In 2013, the National Safety Council estimated there were about 1.4 million crashes in the US  involving cell phone use. Their model predicted text messaging was involved in 6-16% of all car accidents in the US.  In 2010, texting while driving among young drivers was named a disease burden and ranked 8th overall in the global years of life lost (YLL). The premature mortality of young drivers who crash as a result of distracted driving has a greater effect on YLL than most diseases do.

Research by the Transport Research Laboratory showed that texting while driving slowed a driver's reaction time more so than drinking alcohol or using drugs. Driver's reaction times decreased by 46% while making a call, 37% when texting and driving, and 27% during hands-free calls. Those who were drinking and driving at the limit of 80 mg of alcohol per 100ml of blood, reaction times slowed by 13% and 21% for those under the influence of cannabis.

A study by the University of Buffalo revealed that a similar habit, texting while walking, causes more injuries than texting while driving.

In November 2014, Sawyer et al., from the University of Central Florida and the US Air Force Research Laboratory, published the results of comparative study in a driving simulator. Messages sent through Google Glass posed a decreased distraction but still impaired drivers.

In October 2016, Texas A&M Transportation Institute and Aceable Driving published a study showing that teenagers are more likely to witness their parents or legal guardians driving distracted than their friends and peers. The study also suggested that texting and driving bans are somewhat effective. In Austin, Texas, where a hands-free-driving ordinance prohibiting the use of electronic hand-held devices while operating a vehicle or bicycle has been in place since 2015, 41% of teens reported that they never witnessed their parents or guardians driving distracted. In Houston, Texas, which had no ban on hand-held devices during the time of the study, only 23% of teens said the same.

Virginia Tech Transportation Institute study
On July 27, 2009, the Virginia Tech Transportation Institute (VTTI) released preliminary findings of their study of driver distraction in commercial vehicles. Several naturalistic driving studies, of long-haul trucks as well as lighter vehicles driving six million combined miles, used video cameras to observe the drivers and road. Researchers observed 4,452 "safety-critical" events, which includes crashes, near crashes, safety-critical events, and lane deviations. 81% of the "safety-critical" events involved some type of driver distraction. Text messaging had the greatest relative risk, with drivers of heavy vehicles or trucks being more than 23 times more likely to experience a safety-critical event when texting. The study found that drivers typically take their eyes off the forward roadway for an average of four out of six seconds when texting, and an average of 4.6 out of the six seconds surrounding safety-critical events. Some of VTTI's conclusions from this study included that "texting should be banned in moving vehicles for all drivers", and that "all cell phone use should be banned for newly licensed teen drivers". The results of the study are listed in the table below.

Distracted vs. impaired driving
A 2010 experiment with Car and Driver magazine editor Eddie Alterman, which took place at a deserted air strip, showed that texting while driving had a worse impact on safety than driving while intoxicated. The Institute of Industrial Engineers concluded that drivers are 20 times more likely to be involved in an crash while texting and driving as opposed to driving while intoxicated.

While celebrities such as Oprah Winfrey have campaigned against texting while driving, there are reports that the message has not been getting through. The Florida Department of Highway Safety and Motor Vehicles also seeks to bring awareness to the issue and has designated April as Distracted Driving Awareness Month.

Dangers 
The popularity of mobile devices has some unintended and even dangerous consequences.  The use of mobile devices is linked to a significant increase in distracted driving, resulting in injury and even loss of life.

In 2010 the National Highway Traffic Safety Administration reported that distracted drivers were the cause of 18% of all fatal crashes with 3,092 people being killed, and crashes that resulted in injuries with 416,000 people wounded.
According to a Pew Research Centre survey, 40% of American teens say that they have been in a car where the driver used a cell phone in a way which put people in danger.
The Virginia Tech Transportation Institute has found that text messaging creates a crash risk that is 23 times worse than driving while not being distracted.
Eleven percent of drivers who are between the ages of 18 to 20 who were involved in an automobile crash and survived have admitted that they were either sending or receiving texts when they crashed.

Laws by location

A number of countries ban all cell phone use while driving (talking and texting).

Australia
The laws are much the same for all states and territories in Australia. The driver of a vehicle (except an emergency vehicle, taxi or police vehicle) must not use a mobile phone while the vehicle is moving, or is stationary but not parked, unless the driver is exempt from this rule under another law of this jurisdiction. The law does not apply if the phone is in a secured fixed mounting that is positioned in such a way that the driver does not have to take their eyes off the road. The law also does not apply if the driver is using a hands free device. In some jurisdictions, provisional or learner drivers are banned from all forms of mobile phone usage while they are in control of a vehicle. Apart from mobile phones, drivers should not appear to be distracted by anything else; this includes GPS devices and PDAs.

Canada
In 2003, the first ban on cellphone use while driving was enforced within Canada. Since then, this ban has spread to all of the remaining provinces in the country. This ban does not include the use of hands-free devices.

Germany
Any use of a mobile phone is forbidden as long as the vehicle's engine is running. This does however not apply to hand-free devices, provided that the driver does not become distracted. In 2014 a higher court overturned a ruling of a lower court and ruled that the use of a mobile phone is allowed while in traffic, if it occurs while the vehicle is stopped and a start-stop system has turned the engine off.

Netherlands
Any use of a mobile phone is forbidden if the vehicle is moving. This does not apply, however, to hands-free devices.

New Zealand
In 2009, the New Zealand Government introduced new clauses to its Land Transport (Road User) Rule, which ban any use of mobile phones while driving, except for emergency calling to 111 or *555 (only if unsafe or impracticable to stop the vehicle to make the call).

Sweden 
The Government of Sweden, as of December 22, 2012, has stated that texting while driving is not an offence that can lead to a ban, but that it is looking to clarify the Highway Code to include it under reckless driving. In 2013, Sweden outlawed mobile telephone activities if it affects driving in a negative way.

United Arab Emirates
The use of mobiles while driving is prohibited and offenders can also expect to have demerit points added to their record. In one instance a UAE minister was himself given a fine for using his mobile phone while driving.

United Kingdom

Any use of a hand-held mobile phone or similar device while driving, or supervising a learner driver, is illegal. This includes when stopped at traffic lights. The only exceptions are emergency calls to 999 or 112, making a contactless payment while stationary, for instance at a drive-through or toll booth, or using the device to remotely park your vehicle.

United States

Texting while driving is generally outlawed for drivers in all states and the District of Columbia except Montana and Missouri.

On October 1, 2009, the U.S. Department of Transportation (DOT) announced President Barack Obama's signing of an Executive Order directing federal employees not to engage in text messaging while driving government-owned vehicles, among other activities. According to Transportation Secretary Ray Lahood, "This order sends a very clear signal to the American public that distracted driving is dangerous and unacceptable. It shows that the federal government is leading by example." As a part of a larger move to combat distracted driving, the DOT and National Highway Traffic Safety Administration (NHTSA) launched the public information website distraction.gov. In addition, a petition has been created on the White House petitions site, We the People, to ask the Obama administration to encourage all states that have not done so to create laws that ban texting and driving.

On January 26, 2010, the U.S. Department of Transportation announced a federal ban on texting while driving by truckers and bus drivers.

Existing laws

Notable collisions
On August 29, 2007, Danny Oates was killed by a young driver of a car, allegedly texting while driving. The defense had argued that driver Jeffrey Woods had possibly suffered a seizure during the time of the accident.
On January 3, 2008, Heather Leigh Hurd was killed by a truck driver who allegedly was texting while driving. Her father Russell Hurd has been actively supporting a law in various U.S. states called Heather's Law that would prohibit texting while driving.
The 2008 Chatsworth train collision, which killed 25 people, and which occurred on September 12, 2008, was blamed on the operator sending text messages while operating the train.
In May 2009 a crash occurred on the MBTA Green Line in the Boston area of the MBTA, when a driver, 24-year-old Aidan Quinn, was text messaging his girlfriend while driving the train. The crash, which injured 46 people, was estimated by MBTA officials to have cost $9.6 million.
Beverly Hills plastic surgeon Frank Ryan's fatal crash on August 16, 2010, may have been the result of distracted driving due to texting.
 In May 2012 a jury in Corpus Christi, Texas, awarded $21 million in damages to a woman who was struck by a Coca-Cola driver who had been on her cell phone at the time of the accident. The plaintiff's attorneys were able to successfully argue that Coca-Cola's cell phone policy for its drivers was "vague and ambiguous".
 In June 2012 18-year-old Aaron Deveau of Haverhill, Massachusetts, was found guilty of motor vehicle homicide by texting. He was sentenced to two years in prison and loss of his license for 15 years. Deveau was the first person in the state of Massachusetts to be convicted of motor vehicle homicide by texting, and possibly the first in the United States.
 In September 2012, 21-year-old Stephanie Kanoff of Sun Prairie, Wisconsin, was found guilty by a jury in July of homicide by negligent driving for the October 24, 2010, death of Dylan Ellefson, 21, a senior at UW-Madison, who was behind his disabled car when he and his car were struck by Kanoff's minivan. Kanoff was also sentenced to serve two years of extended supervision after her release from prison. In addition to prison and extended supervision, Kanoff was ordered to spend 100 hours speaking to young people learning to drive and other groups about the dangers of texting while driving, and was also ordered to not drive with a phone that's turned on in the driver's area of a car. Kanoff will also have to take a driving safety course to get her license back after a mandatory yearlong revocation.
 In March 2017, near Garner State Park, which is located in Concan, Texas, 13 people in a church bus were killed when a texting pickup truck driver crossed the center line and slammed into their bus.

Technology as a solution

In 2009, it was reported that some companies, including iZUP, ZoomSafer, Aegis Mobility, and cellcontrol by obdEdge employ systems that place restrictions on cell phone usage based on the phone's GPS signal, data from the car itself or from nearby cellphone towers. Also, companies like TextNoMore offer an opt-in solution that rewards users for activating.

The use of telematics to detect drunk driving and texting while driving has been proposed.  A US patent application combining this technology with a usage based insurance product was open for public comment on peer to patent.  The insurance product would not bar texting while driving, but would charge drivers who text and drive a higher premium.

In recent years, location-based technologies that detect potential texting while driving situations have been developed for both the Android operating system and the iPhone operating system (iOS). Other technologies have been developed for law enforcement. A search for "no texting while driving" in Google Play or in the Apple App Store will find several applications that promote safer driving, either through blocking texts, auto-responding or by educating drivers to the dangers of texting while driving. Some of these apps are "paired" and require installation of the app on both the parents' phone and the driver's phones. Paired apps allow remote monitoring of a driver's actions.

Android operating system: In addition to Android Auto, there are apps that utilize the GPS and Network Location services of Android mobile phones to estimate the speed that the cell phone is travelling at the time text messages are sent. As noted before, some of these apps are "paired". One example of a paired app is "TextWatcher". The recommended approach for this app is for parents to install the app on their children's Android mobile phone to silently monitor texting, to send alerts when potential texting while driving situations occur, and to counsel phone holders (in this case, teenage drivers) after the fact. Another app, "Textecution", determines when the phone is traveling higher than 10 mph and shuts down texting abilities.

iPhone operating system (iOS): Apple iPhones using iOS 11 or later have a built-in feature called "Do Not Disturb While Driving". This feature is part of the operating system and does not need to be added or downloaded separately. It uses parameters such as motion detection and network connections to detect driving and can be activated in the iPhone's "Do Not Disturb" settings. To find this feature, tap the "Settings" icon, and then scroll down to "Do Not Disturb". Next, scroll down to "Do Not Disturb While Driving". Once turned on, it will block incoming text messages while the car is being driven. It will also auto-respond to those texts with a customizable message that lets senders know that a person is driving and cannot receive text messages. It can be set to activate in one of three ways: automatically detect driving, activate when connected by Bluetooth to a hands-free device, or it can be set to be activated manually. Paired and non-paired "no texting while driving" apps can also be installed and they are available in the Apple App Store. Importantly, there are some doubts about the effectiveness of this features. For instance, recent research has demonstrated that "Do Not Disturb While Driving" does not always prevent phone-related distractions and interruptions when driving.

Law Enforcement: Over the past few months, various state police forces in Australia have started trial use of cameras that have the ability to pick up errant drivers from more than 500 metres away. Police in Western Australia make use of undercover motorcycles to keep an eye on other motorists and any offence will be recorded on the motorcycle officer's helmet camera. Police in India have become more aggressive on a wide variety of traffic violations and once again, there is a widespread use of cameras.

See also

Distracted driving
Mobile phones and driving safety
 Passenger problem
Death by GPS
List of selfie-related injuries and deaths

References

External links
FCC - The Dangers of Texting While Driving Consumer Guide
Cell phone and driving laws in the United States (including texting)
 Traffic Safety Facts: Driver Electronic Device Use in 2011 (U.S.), National Highway Traffic Safety Administration, April 2013
 

Vehicle law
Road safety
Driver distraction
Driving